Chris McAsey is a New Zealand rower and sailor.

McAsey is from Hāwera with much of his extended family still living in that part of Taranaki. At the 1995 World Rowing Championships in Tampere, Finland, McAsey won a silver medal in the coxed four, with Chris White, Andrew Matheson, Murdoch Dryden, and Michael Whittaker as cox.

He later switched to sailing, joining Team New Zealand as a grinder for their 2003, 2007 and 2013 America's Cup campaigns. He worked as a truck driver after the 2013 America's Cup.

References

Year of birth missing (living people)
New Zealand male rowers
Living people
World Rowing Championships medalists for New Zealand
New Zealand male sailors (sport)
Team New Zealand sailors
2013 America's Cup sailors
2007 America's Cup sailors
2003 America's Cup sailors
Sportspeople from Hāwera